The Accra International Conference Centre is an events venue in Accra, Ghana. Other venues include the Ghana Trade Fair Center and the National Theatre, but the Conference Centre is the most popular due to its size and capacity as compared to the National Theatre, and at the same time smaller than the Ghana Trade Fair Centre (which was built to host pan-African events).

Location 
It is located in the Christiansborg area in Accra Osu and is close to a number of important locations such as the Parliament of Ghana, the Accra Sports Stadium, the Independence Square  and the Black Star Square.

References

Buildings and structures in Accra
Ghana
Government buildings in Ghana